Dimethylhydrazine is the name of two compounds with the molecular formula C2H8N2. These are:

 unsymmetrical dimethylhydrazine (1,1-dimethylhydrazine), with both methyl groups bonded to the same nitrogen atom
 symmetrical dimethylhydrazine (1,2-dimethylhydrazine), with one methyl group bonded to each of the two nitrogen atoms

See also
 monomethylhydrazine, a volatile hydrazine chemical

Hydrazines